State Road 349 (NM 349) is a  state highway in the US state of New Mexico. NM 349's western terminus is at U.S. Route 54 (US 54) north of Carrizozo, and the eastern terminus is at the end of state maintenance in White Oaks.

Major intersections

See also

References

349
Transportation in Lincoln County, New Mexico